Azlan Shah bin Kamaruzaman (born 1 October 1984) is a Malaysian professional Grand Prix motorcycle racer. He currently competes in the Asia Road Racing Championship (ARRC) ASB1000 Championship aboard a BMW S1000RR.

Career

Moto2 World Championship (2013–2015)
He made his debut in the Moto2 class as the substitute rider for Yuki Takahashi at the 2013 San Marino Grand Prix and finish the race in 23rd place, becoming the fourth participant from the ARRC to race in Moto2 after Thitipong Warokorn, Doni Tata Pradita and Rafid Topan Sucipto. He was the winner of the 2013 SuperSports 600cc Asia Road Racing Championship.

In 2014, he continued racing for the Idemitsu Honda Team Asia in the Moto2 World Championship, together with his new team mate, Takaaki Nakagami. He remained with the team into 2015, when he recorded his best finish of fourth, at Motegi.

Prior to the 2016 Moto2 season, he initially withdrew from the championship due to financial problems but later returned when JPMoto Malaysia was taken over by FGV Malaysia Racing. However, Shah withdrew a second time due to further financial problems.

Return to ARRC (2016–present)
In 2016, Shah returned to compete in ARRC in Supersport 600 class with BikeART Racing Kawasaki, where he finished 3rd in the standings with double victory at Johor Circuit. He switched to Manual Tech KYT Team for 2017, partnering Ahmad Yudhistira. He won the championship for the second time with 2 wins in Round 2 at Chang International Circuit and acquired 155 points. For the following year he remained at the team, where he won a race at Suzuka and finished 3rd in the final standings. 

With the introduction of ASB1000 Class in the ARRC, Shah was recruited by ONEXOX TKKR SAG Team for the inaugural season of the class, aboard a BMW S1000RR. He was the winner of the first ASB1000 race ever at Sepang International Circuit (Round 1), and further scored double victories in Round 3 at Chang International Circuit and Round 6 at Sepang International Circuit. He is currently second in overall behind Australian former MotoGP rider Broc Parkes.

Supersport World Championship (2018)
Shah briefly raced in 2018 Supersport World Championship at Chang International Circuit round as a replacement for Kenan Sofuoğlu at Kawasaki Puccetti Racing where he finished the race 16th.

Career statistics

Grand Prix motorcycle racing

Races by year
(key) (Races in bold indicate pole position, races in italics indicate fastest lap)

Supersport World Championship

Races by year
(key) (Races in bold indicate pole position; races in italics indicate fastest lap)

Asia Superbike 1000

Races by year
(key) (Races in bold indicate pole position; races in italics indicate fastest lap)

References

External links

1984 births
Living people
Malaysian motorcycle racers
Moto2 World Championship riders
People from Selangor